G V School, located in Chidambaram (Tamil Nadu, India) is a charitable institution offering free education and vocational skills training for children with disabilities. The school has two divisions supporting intellectually disabled and hearing impaired children. The divisions are named after Mr. G. Vagheesam Pillai and Mrs. R N Suseela Ammal.

The school was established in 1990 with 2 children. Today there are over 90 children from Chidambaram and the surrounding rural areas in the Cuddalore District.

Over the past few years the school has received the following recognition from both the Government and Private Institutions in India,
2008 Building Expansion support from the District Collector 
2007 "The Best Special School" from Raja Muthiah Trust 
2007 The Principal was awarded "The Best Administrator" by the Inner Wheel Club 
2006 The Principal was selected to be a committee member in the Cuddalore District Chapter of National Trust for Disabled  
2003 The National Award for "Best Paper Presented" at the National Conference of Special Educators for the Hearing Impaired  
2003 An award for the Best Institute in Tamil Nadu for Mentally Retarded Children from the Honurable Minister for Social Welfare, Mrs. Valarmathi

References

External links
 Official Website

Special schools in India
Schools in Tamil Nadu
Education in Cuddalore district
Educational institutions established in 1990
1990 establishments in Tamil Nadu